Simhadri may refer to:
 Simhadri (1996 film), a 1996 Kannada film directed by Raj Kishor
 Simhadri (2003 film), a 2003 Telugu film directed by S. S. Rajamouli
 Simhadri (2014 film), a 2014 Kannada film directed by Shivamani
 Simhadri Narasimha Satakam, a poetry collection written Gogulapati Kurmanatha Kavi
 Simhadripuram, a village and a mandal in Kadapa district in the state of Andhra Pradesh, India

Names
Simhadri is also one of the Indian personal or family names
 Simhadri (Telugu: సింహాద్రి) is the other name of Simhachalam, the abode of Lord Lakshmi Narasimha
 Simhadri Satyanarayana Rao, an Indian politician
 Dr. Y. C. Simhadri, Vice Chancellor of Andhra University

Other
 Simhadri Super Thermal Power Plant, a coal-fired thermal power plant located south of Visakhapatnam city, in Andhra Pradesh